Knarrlagsund or Knarrlaget is a village on the island of Ulvøya in the municipality of Hitra in Trøndelag county, Norway.

The village lies along the Knarrlagsundet strait which separates the islands of Ulvøya and Fjellværsøya.  There is a bridge across the strait at Knarrlagsund.

References

Hitra
Villages in Trøndelag